Swoboda Lock is the seventh lock on the Augustów Canal (from the Biebrza). It is situated amidst the Augustów Forest near Lake Studzieniczne. Built between 1826 and 1827 by Lt.-Col. Eng. Jan Paweł Lelewel. In the 1960s has undergone modernization involving the replacement of original wooden gates with metal crank-driven mechanism raised, reinforced concrete bridge was built a distinctive and concreting awanportu. New system to move the gates did not work and was later by one of the membranes removed, and replaced the original system of drawbars.
 Location: 47.4 km channel
 Level difference: 1.7 m
 Length: 45.77 m
 Width: 5.95 m
 Gates: metal
 Year of construction: 1826–1827
 Construction Manager: Lt.-Col. Eng. John Paul Lelewel

References

 
 
 

19th-century establishments in Poland
Swoboda